Dmochy-Glinki  is a village in the administrative district of Gmina Czyżew-Osada, within Wysokie Mazowieckie County, Podlaskie Voivodeship, in north-eastern Poland.

References

Dmochy-Glinki
Łomża Governorate
Białystok Voivodeship (1919–1939)
Belastok Region